Once Upon a Christmas is a collaborative studio album by Kenny Rogers and Dolly Parton. It was released on October 29, 1984, by RCA Nashville.  The album was produced by Rogers with David Foster. It was Rogers' second Christmas album, following 1981's Christmas, and Parton's first. The album's release was accompanied by a CBS television special, Kenny & Dolly: A Christmas to Remember. The album was certified 2× Platinum by the RIAA in 1989.

Background
Rogers and Parton first worked together in 1976 when Rogers was a guest on Parton's syndicated variety series, Dolly. The pair joined forces again on Rogers' 1983 single, "Islands in the Stream", which was a number one hit. Rogers contacted Parton in late 1983 to see if she would be interested in doing a Christmas album with him. Due to the pair's busy schedules, recording didn't take place until August 1984. According to an article in Billboard, the album was completed and mixing had taken place by late September.

In an issue of Cashbox, Rogers said of the album, "I was raised in a Baptist family and I've always thought of Christmas as a special time, a time when families who might be apart the rest of the year can come close together again. Something special also happens when Dolly and I get together: it's a case of the whole being even greater than the sum of its parts." Parton said, "This is the first Christmas special or album that I've ever done, so when Kenny called me with the idea, I jumped at it. Kenny and I love singing together; I think the blend of our voices creates a real electricity that comes across on record. He also has a real Santa Claus spirit. He makes working fun, and approaches things like I do, enjoying the people around him."

Release and promotion
The album was released October 29, 1984 on LP, CD, and cassette.

Rogers and Parton promoted the album's release with a television special titled Kenny & Dolly: A Christmas to Remember, which aired December 2, 1984 on CBS. The Bob Giraldi directed special featured performances of all ten songs from the album. These range from a performance with Rogers and Parton as Santa Claus and Mrs. Claus to a performance at a USO party in World War II London to a rousing finale in a down-home country church. The television special was viewed by 30 million people. Following the special, a video excerpt of the "Christmas Without You" performance was serviced to television stations.

Three singles were issued simultaneously in November 1984: "The Greatest Gift of All" (a duet), "Medley: Winter Wonderland/Sleigh Ride" (a Dolly Parton solo), and "The Christmas Song" (a Kenny Rogers solo). "The Greatest Gift of All" peaked at number 40 on the Billboard Adult Contemporary chart. It also peaked at number 53 on the Hot Country Singles chart and number 81 on the Billboard Hot 100. The Parton solo, "Medley: Winter Wonderland/Sleigh Ride", did not chart during its initial release, but peaked at number 70 on the Billboard Hot Country Songs chart in January 1999. Rogers' solo, "The Christmas Song", failed to chart.

"Christmas Without You" was issued as a single in Europe in November 1984 and peaked at number 88 on the UK Singles Chart. It would be issued as a single in the United States in November 1985, but failed to chart.

A fifth single, "I Believe in Santa Claus", was issued in the United States in November 1987 and also failed to chart.

Critical reception
In a positive review, Billboard said the album "shows signs of emerging as a seasonal blockbuster." The review called Parton's compositions "lively" and said that the album is "devoid of schmaltz" and "sparkles with warmth."

Accolades
The album received the Canadian Country Music Association Award for Top Selling Album in 1985.

|-
| 1985
| Once Upon a Christmas
| Top Selling Album
| 
|-

Commercial performance
The album debuted at number 19 on the Billboard Top Country Albums chart dated December 15, 1984. It peaked at number 12 on the chart dated January 12, 1985. The album has spent a total of 35 weeks on the chart as of December 2019. The album also peaked at number  31 on both the Billboard 200 and the Canadian Albums Chart. The album also saw success in European countries, peaking at number 33 on the Norwegian Albums chart, number 37 on the Dutch Albums chart, and number 40 on the Swedish Albums chart.

The album received Gold and Platinum certifications from the RIAA on December 3, 1984, and was certified 2× Platinum on October 25, 1989, for shipment of 2 million copies. The album received Gold and Platinum certifications from Music Canada on December 1, 1984. The album was certified 3× Platinum on November 14, 1985, and 4× Platinum on January 21, 1987. It was certified 5× Platinum on April 13, 1988, for shipments of 500,000 copies.

Reissues
In 1997, the album was reissued on the BMG Special Products label with an altered track listing. The song order was slightly rearranged and Rogers' two solos were omitted ("The Christmas Song" and "Silent Night"). However, Parton's 1982 recording of "Hard Candy Christmas" from The Best Little Whorehouse in Texas was added.

Track listing

Personnel 
Adapted from the album liner notes.

Performance
 Dolly Parton – vocals
 Kenny Rogers – vocals
 Erich Bulling – keyboards, synthesizer programming
 Jimmy Cox – keyboards
 David Foster – keyboards, rhythm arrangements
 John Hobbs – keyboards
 Randy Waldman – keyboards
 John Goux – guitars
 Paul Jackson Jr. – guitars
 Michael Landau – guitars
 Fred Tackett – guitars
 Kin Vassy – guitars
 Billy Joe Walker Jr. – guitars
 Dennis Belfield – bass
 Joe Chemay – bass
 Neil Stubenhaus – bass
 Ed Greene – drums
 Paul Leim – drums, percussion
 John Robinson – drums
 Victor Feldman – percussion
 Jeremy Lubbock – string arrangements, rhythm arrangements

Production
 David Foster – producer
 Kenny Rogers – producer
 Debbie Caponetta – production assistant
 Humberto Gatica – engineer, mixing
 Tommy Vicari – engineer
 Terry Christian – additional engineer
 Larry Fergusson – additional engineer
 Tom Fouce – additional engineer
 Stuart Furusho – additional engineer
 David Leonard – additional engineer
 Laura Livingston – additional engineer
 Bob Pickering – additional engineer
 John Richards – additional engineer
 Stephen Schmitt – additional engineer
 Stephen Shelton – additional engineer
 Wally Traugott – mastering

Other personnel
 Sandy Gallin – management for Dolly Parton
 Tzetzi Ganev – Dolly Parton's costume
 John Coulter Design – art direction
 Ken Kragen for Kragen & Company – management for Kenny Rogers
 Reid Miles – front and back cover photography
 Dianne Roberson – Dolly Parton's hair
 Cassie Seaver – Dolly Parton's makeup
 Diana Thomas – creative consultant for Dolly Parton
 Gene Trindl for CBS Photography – inner sleeve photography

Charts

Weekly charts

Year-end charts

Certifications

References

1984 Christmas albums
Christmas albums by American artists
Kenny Rogers albums
Dolly Parton albums
RCA Records Christmas albums
Albums produced by David Foster
Vocal duet albums
Country Christmas albums
1984 television specials
Canadian Country Music Association Top Selling Album albums